Aimo Kaarlo Cajander (4 April 1879 – 21 January 1943) was the Prime Minister of Finland up to the Winter War. 

Cajander was born in Uusikaupunki, and became a botanist, a professor of forestry 1911–34; director-general for Finland's Forest and Park Service 1934–1943; Prime Minister in 1922, 1924, and 1937–1939; chairman of the National Progressive Party 1933–1943; and Member of Parliament. 

Cajander came into politics in 1922 when President Ståhlberg asked him to take office of prime minister. He had not earlier participated actively in politics. Ståhlberg invited him as prime minister second time in January 1924. Cajander's short-lived cabinets were merely caretakers before parliamentary elections.

Cajander joined in 1927 National Progressive Party and in 1928 he was chosen as Minister of Defence. Cajander was elected to the Parliament in 1929. When Kyösti Kallio was elected President in 1937, Cajander was asked as the chairman of the National Progressive Party to form majority government. Cajander formed a coalition government of the two largest parties in the parliament - Social Democrats and Agrarian League. Cajander was idealist who did not believe yet in August 1939 that Soviet Union would attack Finland. Partly for this reason the Finnish Army was forced to the fight inadequately equipped. He died in Helsinki, aged 63.

Cajander's name is remembered for "Model Cajander", the fashion of many Finnish soldiers in Winter War: the army was poorly equipped, so mobilized reserves were given a utility belt, an emblem to be attached to the hat — to comply with the Hague Conventions; and a rifle. Otherwise, they had to use their own clothes and equipment.

Cabinets
 Cajander I Cabinet
 Cajander II Cabinet
 Cajander III Cabinet

Awards 

  Order of the Three Stars, 1st Class (April 10, 1937)
 Honorary doctorate of the University of Natural Resources and Life Sciences, Vienna (1924)

References 

|-

|-

1879 births
1943 deaths
People from Uusikaupunki
People from Turku and Pori Province (Grand Duchy of Finland)
National Progressive Party (Finland) politicians
Prime Ministers of Finland
Ministers of Defence of Finland
Members of the Parliament of Finland (1929–30)
Members of the Parliament of Finland (1930–33)
Members of the Parliament of Finland (1936–39)
Members of the Parliament of Finland (1939–45)
Finnish people of World War II
20th-century Finnish botanists
Forestry academics
Finnish foresters
University of Helsinki alumni
Academic staff of the University of Helsinki
World War II political leaders